Susan Lesley Mapstone (born 1956), is a former athlete who competed for England.

Athletics career
Mapstone represented England in the pentathlon event, at the 1974 British Commonwealth Games in Christchurch, New Zealand. Four years later she represented England and won a silver medal in the same event at the 1978 Commonwealth Games in Edmonton, Alberta, Canada.

References

1956 births
English female athletes
Athletes (track and field) at the 1974 British Commonwealth Games
Living people
Commonwealth Games medallists in athletics
Commonwealth Games silver medallists for England
Athletes (track and field) at the 1978 Commonwealth Games
British pentathletes
Medallists at the 1978 Commonwealth Games